Brad Davison (born April 22, 1999) is an American basketball player who currently plays for BC Nevėžis of the Lithuanian Basketball League (LKL). He played college basketball for the Wisconsin Badgers. Davison attended Maple Grove High School where he played basketball and football. He was named to the Big Ten All-Freshman Team after averaging 12.1 points per game.

High school career
Davison attended Maple Grove High School and played both basketball and football. He played as a quarterback on the football field and led the Crimson to an 8–3 record as a senior. He led the West Metro South subdistrict in passing with 2,418 yards and 23 touchdowns, completing 62.9 percent of his throws. Davison finished second in the subdistrict in rushing with 891 yards and 15 scores. Davison was named 2016 Star Tribune Metro Player of the Year. He completed 43 career touchdown passes and rushed for 25 touchdowns. Throughout his career under center, Davison led Maple Grove to three state tournament appearances and a 27–7 record.

On the basketball court, Davison was a four-year starter and captain and earned All-Conference honors during all four of his years playing. He averaged 21.2 points, 6.4 rebounds, and 7.3 assists per game as a junior in leading Maple Grove to a 25–5 record and a state tournament berth. He was named to the Star Tribune All-Metro First Team as a junior. As a senior, he led the team to a 28–4 record and state tournament appearance and was a finalist for Minnesota's Mr. Basketball. He finished his career at Maple Grove as the school's all-time leader in points (2,300), assists (899) and steals (365). He was ranked the  119 recruit in his class by Rivals and committed to playing basketball at Wisconsin on July 11, 2016, choosing the Badgers over offers from Minnesota, Michigan, Butler, Stanford and Northwestern.

College career

Freshman season (2017–2018) 
Davison scored 20 points on December 9, 2017, in an 82–63 loss to Marquette. On February 25, 2018, Davison scored a career-high 30 points in a 68–63 loss to Michigan State. Davison finished as Wisconsin's second-leading scorer as a freshman, averaging 12.1 points per game while shooting 81.8 percent from the free throw line and making a team-high 60 shots from the three-point range. Davison earned a spot on the Big Ten’s All-Freshman team. He sustained numerous shoulder injuries throughout the course of his freshman season, resulting in successful offseason left shoulder surgery. During his freshman season, the Wisconsin men's basketball team missed the NCAA tournament for the first time in 20 years and finished with a 15–18 record and 9th in the Big Ten Conference. The team saw their season end following a loss to the Michigan State Spartans in the Big Ten tournament on March 2, 2018.

Sophomore season (2018–2019) 

Davison began his sophomore season in a slump, hitting 10-for-35 (28.6 percent) of his shots in his first 10 games. In a 12-game stretch in the middle of the season, Davison shot much better, hitting 29-for-53 (54.7 percent) of his three-pointers. He finished the season in a slump as well, going 13-for-61 (21.3 percent) in his final 12 games. He averaged 10.5 points per game as a sophomore, shooting 34.9 percent from beyond the arc. Davison was an Academic All-Big Ten honoree. He dealt with a foot and ankle injury throughout the season, often wearing a protective boot after games. He gained a reputation from opposing fan bases for receiving flagrant fouls and tripping players, something Wisconsin coach Greg Gard attributed to Davison playing extremely hard. Davison also received attention for excessive flopping, and the NCAA rule to combat it was informally called "the Brad Davison rule."

Junior season (2019–2020) 
As a junior, Davison became the team's emotional leader with the departure of Ethan Happ. During a three-game stretch in November and December 2019, Davison shot 3-of-20 as Wisconsin lost all three games. He scored 14 points and hit the game-winning three-pointer with 9.1 seconds remaining in a 56–54 upset of Maryland on January 14, 2020. On January 29, Davison was suspended one game by the Big Ten for a flagrant foul he committed the previous game in which he struck Iowa's Connor McCaffery in the groin. On February 15, Davison tied a career-high with 30 points and his eight three-pointers tied a school record set by Bronson Koenig in an 81–64 win over Nebraska. On February 23, Davison became the 45th player in Wisconsin history to score 1,000 points during a game against Rutgers. Davison averaged 9.9 points and 4.3 rebounds per game as a junior.

Senior season (2020–2021) 
Davison scored a season-high 29 points in an 85–62 win against North Carolina in the Round of 64 of the NCAA Tournament. As a senior, Davison averaged 10 points, 3.5 rebounds, and 2.4 assists per game. He announced that he would be returning for a fifth season of eligibility, taking advantage of the NCAA's decision regarding athletes who participated in the 2020–21 season.

Fifth season (2021–2022) 
Coming into the 2021–22 season, Davison assumed a leadership role with the departure of several top players, although teammate Johnny Davis emerged as a national player of the year candidate. On January 27, 2022, Davison broke the Wisconsin career record for made three-pointers during a game against Nebraska, breaking Bronson Koenig's mark of 270. He finished with 21 points including five made three-pointers in a 73–65 win. Davison was named to the Second Team All-Big Ten by the coaches and Third Team by the media. Davison averaged 14.1 points, 4.0 rebounds and 2.1 assists per game as a fifth-year senior.

Professional career
On August 2, 2022, Davison signed with BC Nevėžis of the Lithuanian Basketball League (LKL).

Career statistics

College

|-
| style="text-align:left;"| 2017–18
| style="text-align:left;"| Wisconsin
| 33 || 29 || 31.2 || .405 || .355 || .818 || 2.3 || 2.5 || 1.2 || .0 || 12.1
|-
| style="text-align:left;"| 2018–19
| style="text-align:left;"| Wisconsin
| 34 || 34 || 32.2 || .385 || .349 || .809 || 3.3 || 1.8 || 1.1 || .1 || 10.5
|-
| style="text-align:left;"| 2019–20
| style="text-align:left;"| Wisconsin
| 30 || 30 || 30.9 || .395 || .359 || .844 || 4.3 || 1.9 || .8 || .0 || 9.9
|-
| style="text-align:left;"| 2020–21
| style="text-align:left;"| Wisconsin
| 31 || 31 || 31.0 || .345 || .389 || .868 || 3.5 || 2.4 || 1.1 || .0 || 10.0
|-
| style="text-align:left;"| 2021–22
| style="text-align:left;"| Wisconsin
| 33 || 33 || 34.4 || .384 || .347 || .864 || 4.0 || 2.1 || 0.8 || .0 || 14.1
|- class="sortbottom"
| style="text-align:center;" colspan="2"| Career 
| 161 || 157 || 32.0 || .383 || .359 || .840 || 3.5 || 2.1 || 1.0 || .0 || 11.3

Personal life
Davison identifies as a Christian.  He has two older sisters, Stephanie and Angie, both of whom played on the Northern Iowa Panthers women's basketball team, graduating in 2016 and 2017 respectively. In high school, Davison achieved a 4.0 GPA and was named the 2017 Scholar-Athlete award from the Minnesota Chapter of the National Football Foundation. He was a member of National Honor Society in high school. Throughout his life, Davison has participated in more than 120 hours of volunteer work, going on service trips to Jamaica and Costa Rica and also at Shriners Prom. Davison was a member of Maple Grove's Fellowship of Christian Athletes and its GOLD program, which feeds impoverished peoples across the world. He is majoring in business management and human resources at Wisconsin.

In July 2021, Davison became engaged to Tyra Buss, an assistant coach at Milwaukee and former Indiana player.

See also
 List of NCAA Division I men's basketball career games played leaders

References

External links
Wisconsin Badgers bio

1999 births
Living people
American expatriate basketball people in Lithuania
American football quarterbacks
American men's basketball players
Basketball players from Minnesota
Categort:BC Nevėžis players
People from Maple Grove, Minnesota
Shooting guards
Wisconsin Badgers men's basketball players